The Gallipoli–Casarano railway is an Italian  long railway line, that connects Gallipoli with Casarano and Gagliano del Capo. The route operates through the region of Apulia.

History

The line was opened in 1919.

Usage
The line is used by the following service(s):

Local services (Treno regionale) Gallipoli - Casarano

See also 
 List of railway lines in Italy

References

This article is based upon a translation of the Italian language version as of February 2015.

External links 

Railway lines in Apulia
Railway lines opened in 1919